Eschau is a commune in the Bas-Rhin department in Grand Est in north-eastern France.

It is situated 8 km south of Strasbourg.

Population

Sights 
Eschau's main sight is the Église Saint-Trophime, a Romanesque church dedicated to Trophimus of Arles. The building dates back to the 8th century but has been rebuilt several times until the end of the 13th century. It contains relics of Sophia the Martyr in a Gothic chasse and several wooden polychrome 15th-century Gothic statues. The 12th-century cloister has been destroyed but several capitals and other pieces of Romanesque sculpture by the Master of Eschau have survived and are on display in the Musée de l'Œuvre Notre-Dame.

See also
 Communes of the Bas-Rhin department

References

Communes of Bas-Rhin
Bas-Rhin communes articles needing translation from French Wikipedia